Ferromirum is an extinct genus of symmoriiform fish known from the late Devonian (mid Famennian) Ibâouane Formation in the southeastern Anti-Atlas of Morocco, with a single species Ferromirum oukherbouchi. It is known from a single well preserved skeleton, which is of a small individual less than half a metre in length. The jaws and hyoid arch are preserved uncrushed. The skull has large orbits (eye sockets) which have sclerotic rings. The teeth are small and have a cladodont morphology. The body is slender. The first dorsal fin has a smooth fin spine, which curves posteriorly towards its tip.

References 

Devonian sharks
Symmoriiformes